Carmen Laura García Fernández (born c. 1987) is a Spanish beauty queen. She was 1st runner up in the annual national Miss Spain 2009 at a gala held in Cancun, Mexico. She represented Spain in Miss World 2009 and was unplaced although she was Top 22 in the fast track Miss World Talent.

Miss España
García won the Miss Granada 2008 pageant. She represented her state in the Miss España 2009 (Miss Spain 2009), where she was 1st runner up in Cancun, Mexico. Fifty-two contestants competed in the Miss Spain 2009 pageant, which was held for the first time outside of Spain.

Miss World 2009
García  represented Spain in the 59th edition of Miss World beauty pageant and was unplaced but she was Top 22 in the fast track Miss World Talent. The pageant was held on December 12, 2009 at the Gallagher Convention Centre in Johannesburg, South Africa. 112 contestants from different countries and territories competed in the event.

See also
Miss World
Miss World 2009

References

1980s births
Living people
Miss World 2009 delegates
Spanish beauty pageant winners
People from Granada